The following highways are numbered 257:

Canada
 Manitoba Provincial Road 257
 Prince Edward Island Route 257
 Quebec Route 257

Costa Rica
 National Route 257

Japan
 Japan National Route 257

United States
 Alabama State Route 257
 California State Route 257
 Colorado State Highway 257
 Florida State Road 257 (former)
 Georgia State Route 257
 Indiana State Road 257
 K-257 (Kansas highway)
Kentucky Route 257
 Maryland Route 257
 Minnesota State Highway 257
 Montana Secondary Highway 257
 New York State Route 257
 Ohio State Route 257
 Pennsylvania Route 257
 Tennessee State Route 257
 Texas State Highway 257 (former)
 Texas State Highway Loop 257
 Farm to Market Road 257 (Texas)
 Utah State Route 257
 Virginia State Route 257